is Japanese tokusatsu drama and the 36th entry in Toei Company's Super Sentai metaseries, following Kaizoku Sentai Gokaiger. Its theme is based on spy movies and cyber technology and premiered on February 26, 2012 on TV Asahi, joining Kamen Rider Fourze and then Kamen Rider Wizard as a program featured in TV Asahi's Super Hero Time programming block.

Some of the villains are designed by Yutaka Izubuchi; marking his return to Super Sentai character design after 1986's Choushinsei Flashman.

Tokumei Sentai Go-Busters began airing in South Korea in 2013 as Power Rangers Go-Busters.

In the United States, Tokumei Sentai Go-Busters was adapted as Power Rangers Beast Morphers; the first episode premiered on March 2, 2019. Beast Morphers was to be produced by Saban Brands but, on July 2, 2018, Hasbro would acquire all of the former company's entertainment assets, including the Power Rangers franchise.

Plot

Thirteen years ago in the  calendar, the computer controlling the newly discovered energy source called  was infected by a virus that caused it to create the evil energy being known as Messiah who wishes to take over mankind and create a world made for machines. Though sent into subspace by the scientists' sacrifice, Messiah's actions established the formation of the Energy Management Center's Special Ops Unit from three children who were caught in the crossfire, the Go-Busters, and their Buddyroids. In the present, 2012 NCE, a mysterious figure named Enter leads a group called Vaglass on incursions to gather enough Enetron to bring Messiah back. However, training for this day, the Go-Busters and their Buddyroids are deployed to combat Vaglass's Metaroids and Megazords to protect the city's Enetron from them. Later joined by Masato Jin and his Buddyroid Beet J. Stag, the Go-Busters' resolve is strengthened once they learn the true nature of their enemy and the horrors that would result should Messiah enter their world.

Episodes

Each episode of Go-Busters is called a "Mission".

Production
On September 2, 2011, Toei applied for trademarks on the title to be used on various products. The Japan Patent Office approved these trademarks on September 29, 2011.

Films
The Go-Busters make their debut appearance as a cameo in Kaizoku Sentai Gokaigers third film Kaizoku Sentai Gokaiger vs. Space Sheriff Gavan: The Movie.

Super Hero Taisen

 is a film celebrating the 10th anniversary of the Super Hero Time programming block on TV Asahi, featuring a crossover between the characters of the Kamen Rider and Super Sentai Series. The cast of Go-Busters participate in the film, along with the cast of Kamen Rider Decade, Kaizoku Sentai Gokaiger and Kamen Rider Fourze. The event of the movie takes place between Mission 8 and 9.

Protect the Tokyo Enetower!

 is the main theatrical release for Tokumei Sentai Go-Busters where the Go-Busters must help protect the Tokyo Enetower along with the help of Tokyo Tower's mascot character . It is set to be released on August 4, 2012, alongside the film for Kamen Rider Fourze. The event of the movie takes place between Mission 19 and 20.

Go-Busters vs. Gokaiger

 is set to be released in theaters on January 19, 2013. As with previous VS movies, this film will feature a crossover between the casts of Tokumei Sentai Go-Busters and Kaizoku Sentai Gokaiger, while introducing the 37th Super Sentai, Zyuden Sentai Kyoryuger which is set to start airing in 2013, following the end of Go-Busters. The event of the movie takes place between Mission 41 and 42.

Super Hero Taisen Z

 is a film that was released in Japan on April 27, 2013, which featured the first crossover between characters of Toei's three main Tokusatsu franchises, Kamen Rider, Super Sentai, and the Space Sheriff Series, including other heroes from the Metal Hero Series as well. The protagonists of Space Sheriff Gavan: The Movie, Tokumei Sentai Go-Busters, and Kaizoku Sentai Gokaiger are featured, but the casts of Kamen Rider Wizard, Zyuden Sentai Kyoryuger, and Kamen Rider Fourze also participate in the film. Arisa Komiya reprises her role in the main cast as Yoko Usami, while the rest of the cast have a minor role in the film.

Kyoryuger vs. Go-Busters

 is the Go-Busters second VS movie featuring a crossover with the cast of Zyuden Sentai Kyoryuger, scheduled for release on January 18, 2014.

Ultra Super Hero Taisen
A crossover film, titled  featuring the casts of Kamen Rider Ex-Aid, Amazon Riders, Uchu Sentai Kyuranger, and Doubutsu Sentai Zyuohger, was released in Japan on March 25, 2017. This movie also celebrates the 10th anniversary of Kamen Rider Den-O and features the spaceship Andor Genesis from the Xevious game, which is used by the movie's main antagonists, as well as introduces the movie-exclusive Kamen Rider True Brave, played by Kamen Rider Brave's actor Toshiki Seto from Kamen Rider Ex-Aid, and the villain Shocker Great Leader III, played by the singer Diamond Yukai. In addition, individual actors from older Kamen Rider and Super Sentai TV series, Ryohei Odai (Kamen Rider Ryuki), Gaku Matsumoto (Shuriken Sentai Ninninger), Atsushi Maruyama (Zyuden Sentai Kyoryuger), and Hiroya Matsumoto (Tokumei Sentai Go-Busters) reprise their respective roles.

Kyuranger vs. Space Squad

 is a V-Cinema release that features a crossover between Uchu Sentai Kyuranger and Space Squad. Aside from the main cast of Kyuranger, Yuma Ishigaki and Hiroaki Iwanaga (Space Sheriff Gavan: The Movie), Yuka Hirata (Juken Sentai Gekiranger), Mitsuru Karahashi (Samurai Sentai Shinkenger), Kei Hosogai (Kaizoku Sentai Gokaiger) and Ayame Misaki (Tokumei Sentai Go-Busters) return to reprise their respective roles. The V-Cinema will be released on DVD and Blu-ray on August 8, 2018.

Special DVD
 is a special DVD by Kodansha that is used to show some of the items in the series. In the DVD, Beet J. Stag starts going haywire after drinking spiked Enetron left in the base by Enter, and Enter steals Masato's Morphin Blaster to become an evil version of Beet Buster, fighting with the Metaroid Junkroid. With Space Sheriff Gavan's help, Hiromu manages to free J of the infection and beat both Enter and Junkroid. The event of the specials takes place between Mission 31 and 32.

V-Cinema
 is a V-Cinema release for Go-Busters that became available for sale on June 21, 2013, and takes place between Missions 44 and 45. While getting ready for New Year's, the Go-Busters are killed by the Great Demon Lord Azazel. Finding himself before God (Syo Jinnai) alongside J, Nick uses his status as the one-millionth death in 2012 to alter history so that Messiah never existed. However, history repeats itself when Azazel kills the new Go-Busters and Nick ends up in Heaven again. This time, he wishes for both Go-Buster groups to team up against Azazel in his original reality. After destroying Azazel, the other Go-Busters fade away while the original Go-Busters and Nick pay their respects to them.

Video game
A Tokumei Sentai Go-Busters video game for the Nintendo DS was released on September 27, 2012. The game was released in Korea as Power Rangers: Go-Busters on August 8, 2013. This was the last official Nintendo DS game to be released in physical media in South Korea.

Cast
: 
: 
: 
: 
: 
: 
: 
: 
: 
: 
: 
: 
: 
: 
: 
Narration:

Guest cast

: 
: 
:  
 (31, 32): 
:

Songs
Opening themes

Lyrics: Shoko Fujibayashi
Composition, Arrangement: Kenichiro Oishi
Artist: Hideyuki Takahashi (Project.R)
 Episodes: 1-27
The song also played in episodes 30, 44, and 50.

Lyrics: Shoko Fujibayashi
Composition, Arrangement: Kenichiro Oishi
Artist: Hideyuki Takahashi (Project.R)
 Episodes: 28-49
Ending theme

Lyrics: Shoko Fujibayashi
Composition, Arrangement: Kenichiro Oishi
Artist: 
 Episodes: 1-8, 11-22, 28-44
"One wish, One day"
Lyrics: Shoko Fujibayashi
Composition, Arrangement: Morihiro Suzuki
Artist: Hiromu Sakurada & Cheeda Nick (Katsuhiro Suzuki & Keiji Fujiwara)
 Episodes: 9, 10, 24

Lyrics: Shoko Fujibayashi
Composition, Arrangement: Masaaki Asada
Artist: Yoko Usami & Usada Lettuce (Arisa Komiya & Tatsuhisa Suzuki)
 Episodes: 23
"Blue Banana Moon"
Lyrics: Shoko Fujibayashi
Composition, Arrangement: Hiroshi Takaki
Artist: Ryuji Iwasaki & Gorisaki Banana (Ryoma Baba & Tesshō Genda)
 Episodes: 25

Lyrics: Shoko Fujibayashi
Composition, Arrangement: Kenichiro Oishi
Artist: Nazo no Shin Unit Starmen
 Episodes: 26, 27

Notes

References

External links

 at Toei Company
 at Super-Sentai.net
 at Nippon Columbia

2012 Japanese television series debuts
2013 Japanese television series endings
Cyberpunk television series
Super Sentai
Television series about animals
Television series about artificial intelligence
Television shows written by Yasuko Kobayashi